Rio Tainhas is a river in the state of Rio Grande do Sul, Brazil. It is a left tributary of the Das Antas River

Part of the course of the river, including the Cachoeira do Passo do S, a waterfall, is protected by the   Tainhas State Park, created in 1975.

See also
List of rivers of Rio Grande do Sul

References

Rivers of Rio Grande do Sul